Hamilton J. Nichols, Jr. (October 18, 1924 – July 6, 2013) was a guard in the National Football League (NFL). He played his first three seasons with the Chicago Cardinals. After a season away from the NFL, he played with the Green Bay Packers during the 1951 NFL season.  Nichols played college football at Rice University and was a member of the 1944 College Football All-America Team.

References

External links

1924 births
2013 deaths
American football offensive guards
Chicago Cardinals players
Green Bay Packers players
Rice Owls football players
Players of American football from Houston